The  Little League World Series took place between August 22 and August 26 in Williamsport, Pennsylvania. The West Tokyo Little League of West Tokyo, Japan, defeated the North Roseland Little League of Chicago, Illinois, in the championship game of the 21st Little League World Series.

Teams

Winners Bracket
{{Round8-with third

|August 20| Japan|1| Canada|0
|August 20| Florida|1| Pennsylvania|3
|August 21| Illinois|1| Spain|0
|August 21| Mexico|1| California|0

|August 24| Japan|4| Pennsylvania|1
|August 24 (F/8)| Illinois|8| Mexico|3

|August 26| Japan|4| Illinois|1

|August 25| Pennsylvania' |2| Mexico|1
}}

Consolation BracketBoth Games C and D were cancelled''

Notable players
 Bobby Mitchell of Northridge went on to play in MLB as an outfielder from 1980 to 1983

External links
1967 Little League World Series
Line scores for the 1967 LLWS

Little League World Series
Little League World Series
Little League World Series